The Bridge of Sighs is a bridge in Venice. Bridge of Sighs may also refer to:

Arches, bridges and buildings

Europe
 Bridge of Sighs (Cambridge), a bridge in Cambridge, England
 Bridge of Sighs (Chester), a bridge in Chester, England
 Bridge of Sighs (Oxford), a bridge in Oxford, England
Bridge of Sighs, an uncovered bridge in Glasgow, Scotland from the Cathedral to the Glasgow Necropolis
 Långholmsbron, a bridge in Stockholm, Sweden
The Bridge of Sighs (Seufzerbrücke), at the Römer, a medieval building in  Frankfurt am Main, Germany
The Bridge of Sighs (Sóhajok hídja), a bridge in Szeged, Hungary, connecting the City Hall and House of Labor buildings by Széchenyi Square

North America
 Bridge of Sighs, a bridge in the Santa Barbara County Courthouse, Santa Barbara, California
 Bridge of Sighs, the Virginia Street Bridge in Reno, Nevada, known for being the place where newly-divorced women coming from the Washoe County Courthouse would toss their wedding rings into the Truckee River
 Bridge of Sighs, a bridge between the Allegheny County Courthouse and the old county jail in downtown Pittsburgh, Pennsylvania, United States, which has been deemed a National Historic Landmark
 Bridge of Sighs, a bridge that connected The Tombs with the Criminal Courts Building in New York City
 Bridge of Sighs, one of the few natural arches in the Grand Canyon that is visible from the Colorado River (at mile 35.6, approx 57.3 km on the right); it is located in Redwall limestone and has a span of 4 metres (15 feet) and a height of 9 metres (30 feet).
 Bridge of Sighs, a bridge at The Venetian in Las Vegas

South America
 Puente de los Suspiros ("Bridge of Sighs" in Spanish), a bridge in the Barranco District, Lima, Peru

Literature
 Bridge of Sighs (novel), a novel by Richard Russo
 Bridge of Sighs, a novel by Jane Lane
 Bridge of Sighs: Chelsea's 1996–97 Season, a book by Steven Downes
 Le pont des soupirs (The Bridge of Sighs), a novel by Michel Zevaco
 The Bridge of Sighs, a novel by Olen Steinhauer
 "The Bridge of Sighs" (poem), a poem by Thomas Hood

Music
 Bridge of Sighs (Robin Trower album), or the title song
 Bridge of Sighs (Ralph McTell album), or the title song

 "Bridge Of Sighs", a 1900 song written by James Thornton
 Le pont des soupirs (The Bridge of Sighs), an opéra bouffe, or operetta, by Jacques Offenbach

Film
 The Bridge of Sighs (1925 film), an American drama film
 The Bridge of Sighs (1936 film), an American crime film